Tiong Bahru GRC was a defunct three-member group representation constituency that from 1988 to 1991, comprised Henderson, Radin Mas, and Tiong Bahru, in Singapore. Once it is dissolved, it was quickly replaced by Tanjong Pagar GRC.Tiong Bahru GRC was led by Ch'ng Jit Koon and Co-led by S.Vasoo.

Members of Parliament

Candidates and results

Elections in the 1980s

References

Singaporean electoral divisions
Tiong Bahru